Jovica Vico (born 27 February 1978) is former Bosnian professional footballer.

Club career
He has played for Bosnian club NK Čelik Zenica, Mexican clubs CD Toluca and Atlético Mexiquense, Montenegrin FK Čelik Nikšić, Slovenian clubs NK Maribor and NK Šmartno, Austrian SK Rapid Wien and FK Leotar in the Premier League of Bosnia and Herzegovina.

In February 2008 he was part of the Bosnia and Herzegovina A2 team.

By June 2015 he was sports director of FK Leotar.

References

External sources
 Stats from 2010-11 at BiHsoccer

1978 births
Living people
Serbs of Bosnia and Herzegovina
Association football forwards
Bosnia and Herzegovina footballers
NK Čelik Zenica players
Deportivo Toluca F.C. players
Atlético Mexiquense footballers
FK Čelik Nikšić players
NK Maribor players
NK Šmartno ob Paki players
SK Rapid Wien players
FK Leotar players
FK Mladost Gacko players
Slovenian PrvaLiga players
Second League of Serbia and Montenegro players
Austrian Football Bundesliga players
Premier League of Bosnia and Herzegovina players
First League of the Republika Srpska players
Bosnia and Herzegovina expatriate footballers
Expatriate footballers in Mexico
Bosnia and Herzegovina expatriate sportspeople in Mexico
Expatriate footballers in Serbia and Montenegro
Bosnia and Herzegovina expatriate sportspeople in Serbia and Montenegro
Expatriate footballers in Slovenia
Bosnia and Herzegovina expatriate sportspeople in Slovenia
Expatriate footballers in Austria
Bosnia and Herzegovina expatriate sportspeople in Austria